The 2000 McDonald's All-American Boys Game was an All-star basketball game played on Wednesday, March 29, 2000 at the FleetCenter in Boston, Massachusetts. The game's rosters featured the best and most highly recruited high school boys graduating in 2000. The game was the 23rd annual version of the McDonald's All-American Game first played in 1978.

2000 game
The game was telecast live by ESPN. The venue was the FleetCenter, home of the Boston Celtics of the NBA. The game was characterized by the high efficiency of the West players: the team took advantage of the bigger players in the roster and scored many points in the paint. Center Zach Randolph was the MVP of the game with 23 points and 15 rebounds. Other players who starred were DeShawn Stevenson, the game top scorer with 25 points; Darius Miles with his 17 points; Andre Brown, another player who recorded a double-double with 20 points and 14 rebounds, like Gerald Wallace (15 pts/10 rebs); Andre Barrett, the agile 5-9 point guard, recorded 12 assists, the second best performance in the event history. Of the 24 players, 13 went on to play at least 1 game in the NBA. Following their good performance in the All-American game both Miles and Stevenson decided to forgo college and declared for the 2000 NBA Draft: Miles was the 3rd overall pick and Stevenson the 23rd.

East roster

West roster

Coaches
The East team was coached by:
 Head Coach William Loughnane of South Boston High School (Boston, Massachusetts)
 Asst Coach Mike Rubin of East Boston High School (Boston, Massachusetts)

The West team was coached by:
 Head Coach Rick Sherley of Alief Hastings High School (Alief, Texas)
 Asst Coach Mike Smallwood of Alief Hastings High School (Alief, Texas)

All-American Week

Contest winners 
 The 2000 Slam Dunk contest was won by DeShawn Stevenson.
 The 2000 3-point shoot-out was won by Chris Duhon.

References

External links
McDonald's All-American on the web
McDonald's All-American all-time rosters 
McDonald's All-American rosters at Basketball-Reference.com
Game stats at Realgm.com

1999–2000 in American basketball
2000
2000 in sports in Massachusetts
2000